The following is a list of schools in the Afghan capital, Kabul. It includes elementary and high schools. Some are schools for boys only while others are strictly for girls. All schools in Afghanistan are run by the Ministry of Education and free to the public although some private ones may charge fees.

A–M

  Afghan school
 Abdul Ali Mustaghni High School
 Abdul Hadi Dawi High School
 Abdul Qadir Shahid High School
 Abul Qasem-e-Ferdowsi High School
 Afghanistan National School
 Afghanistan Relief Organization Technology Education Center (TEC)
 Afghanistan Technical Vocational Institute
 Afghan Turk High Schools 
 Afghan Yaar High School
 Ahmad Shah Baba High School
 Ahmad Shah Massoud High School
 Aisha-i-Durani School
 Al Fattha High School
 Amani High School 
 Aryana Kabul
 Aryana Kabul N(2) (Source: www.moe.gov.af/dr)
 Ashaqan Arefan School
 Durkhanai High School
 Esteqlal High School 
 Ghazi High School
 Ghulam Haider Khan High School
 Habibia High School
 Hazrat Ibrahim Khalilullah High School
 International School of Kabul
 Kaseer-ul-Estifada High School
 Saidal Nasri High School
 Mustaqbal High School
 Khushal Khan High School
 Lamia Shaheed High School
 Malalai High School
 Malika Suraya High School
 Marefat High School
 Mohammad Alam Faiz Zad High School
  Bibi Mahroo Zokor/enas

N–Z

 Naderia High School
 Nazo Ana High School 
 Pamir Naween High School
 Payam Private High School
 Rabia-e-Balkhi High School
 Rahman Baba High School
 Shah Shaheed School
 Sir Asyab Girls High School
 Sultana Razia School
 Tajwar Sultana Girls School
 Yakatoot High School
 Zarghona Ana High School
 The Smart School

See also

 Education in Afghanistan
 List of schools in Afghanistan

Schools
Schools
Kabul, Schools
Schools